Battleship Lake is a lake on Vancouver Island east of Lake Helen Mackenzie on Forbidden Plateau in Strathcona Provincial Park. It was named Battleship Lake because the discoverer's young son pointed out that the trees on the three islands resembled battleships at anchor.

References

Alberni Valley
Lakes of Vancouver Island
Comox Land District